The Jungang line is a railway line connecting Cheongnyangni in Seoul to Moryang in Gyeongju in South Korea, traversing central South Korea from the northwest to the southeast. It is also referred to the rail line of the Seoul Metropolitan Subway from Yongsan station to Jipyeong station. The section from Cheongnyangni to Dodam was designated as a semi-high-speed railway.

History

The Jungang line was opened along its full length between Cheongnyangni and Gyeongju on April 1, 1942. Jungang means "central" in Korean, and describes the line's route through the mountains in the east-central part of South Korea. When Korea was under Japanese rule, the line was briefly known as Gyeonggyeong Line, referring to line running between Seoul and Gyeongju.

On 1 December 1938 'Donghae Jungbu line' (Daegu–Haksan) was divided into the three parts: Daegu Line, Gyeongygeong line and Donghae Jungbu line, which was later merged into the Donghae Nambu Line. At the same time the Gyeonggyeong line was extended to the Ubo Station. The southern part, Gyeonggyeong Nambu Line, was opened as follows:

On the other hand, the northern part, Gyeonggyeong Bukpu Line, was constructed as follows:

On 1 April 1942 the two lines was merged into the Gyeonggyeong Line with the opening of the section Jechon–Yeongju (62.3 km). The name of the line was changed back to its present name after the end of World War II.

Following the 1961 coup, the Supreme Council for National Reconstruction started South Korea's first five-year plan, which included a construction program to complete the railway network, to foster economic growth.

Upgrade

A part of the line was the first to be electrified with the 25 kV/60 Hz AC catenary system in South Korea: the catenary on the 155.2 km long Cheongnyangri–Jecheon section went into service on June 20, 1973. The 29.0 km long extension to Danseong followed on December 30, 1987, finally the 35.0 km long extension to Yeongju on December 23, 1988.

The entire line is foreseen for electrification and double-tracking.

Phase 1: Cheongnyangni–Deokso
The double-tracking of the 18.0 km long section from the terminus Cheongnyangni to Deokso was completed first on December 16, 2005. Work started in mid-2001 with a planned budget of 1,700 billion won.

On September 1, 2010, the South Korean government announced a strategic plan to reduce travel times from Seoul to 95% of the country to under 2 hours by 2020. As part of the plan, the Cheongnyangri–Wonju section of the Jungang Line is to be further upgraded for 230 km/h.

Phase 2: Deokso-Wonju 
The first 5.7 km to Paldang was opened on December 27, 2007, the next 15.9 km to Guksu on December 29, 2008, and another 19.7 km to Yongmun on December 23, 2009. The total budget of the 90.4&km long upgrade project is 2,036.847 billion won.

The upgrade of the Deokso–Wonju section is more extensive, with significant re-alignments to enable a line speed of 150 km/h.

Phase 3: Wonju–Jecheon Electrified Double Track Line Project
Wonju–Jecheon Electrified Double Track Line Project(원주~제천 복선전철사업) was launched in 2011, connecting Seowonju station at Wonju and Bongyang station at Jecheon. Between Seowonju and Bongyang, the double-track line is to run in a new alignment, most of which will be the 25,080 metre long Musil Tunnel. Works on the tunnel are slated to commence in June 2011, for a planned start of service on the Wonju-Jecheon section in January 2021. The new line will reduce line distance by 5.5 km and cut travel time by 20 minutes. The project budget for the entire 41.1 km Wonju-Jecheon section is 1,140.061 billion won. Later, this plan was redesigned to build two tunnels instead of single long tunnel to reduce safety issue. On June 22, 2020, construction was completed and Korean National Railway(KR) started trial running. KR announced that commercial running would be started at January 5.

Plans for the double-tracking of the section from Bongyang, the terminus of the Chungbuk Line, to Jecheon, have been prepared separately.

Under the government's 2010 strategic plan for 2020, the new alignment in the Wonju–Bongyang section would be laid out for 250 km/h, the rest to Jecheon would be upgraded for 230 km/h.

Phase 4: Dodam-Yeongcheon

Jecheon-Dodam Section
The Jecheon–Dodam section, 17.4 km in length, was in construction with a budget of 320.024 billion won for a targeted opening in 2011, and is primarily intended to improve capacity for freight transports to a cement factory. The project is completed on 31 March 2011.

Dodam-Andong Section 
Started at December 2013, Dodam-Andong section is planned to be electrified double-track line. Danyang-Yeongju re-alignment line in single-track opened 13 December 2020, Yeongju-Danchon re-alignment line in single-track opened 17 December 2020. Finally Danyang-Danchon line in double-track railway is planned to open in August 2021.

Andong-Yeongcheon Section 
This section is planned to open Summer 2022 as electrified single-track line. Upgrade to double-track line here is not yet planned.

Phase 5: Yeongcheon-Singyeongju 
Electrification and doubling in this section were completed on December 28, 2021.

Services

KTX service 
KTX service was launched on 5 January 2021. Since Jungang Line is not a dedicated high-speed line, the new rolling-stock KTX-Eum was adopted. KTX service will be expanded to Bujeon station. And KTX-Eum is expect to connect Cheongnyangni and Bujeon in 1 hour and 6 minutes.

Regular rail service
Before the KTX era, trans-Korean Tongil-ho trains were in operation on the Jungang and Donghae Nambu lines, providing a 12-hour train journey from Seoul to Busan.

The entire line is served by cross-country Mugunghwa-ho trains, which are most frequent until Jecheon, where many trains continue east on the Taebaek Line. As of October 2010, the travel time from Cheongnyangni in Seoul is a minimum of 1 hour 18 minutes to Wonju, 2 hours 2 minutes to Jecheon, around 3 hours to Yeongju, 5 hours 22 minutes to Yeongcheon, and 6 hours 8 minutes to Gyeongju. Some trains continue to Bujeon station in Busan, with a total travel time of 8 hours by day and 20 minutes shorter by night.

Seoul Metropolitan Subway

Commuter rail service was launched on Jungang line (fully integrated with the Seoul Metropolitan Subway) as the upgrading of the line progressed. The service started on December 16, 2005, connecting parts of the Gyeongwon Line (from Yongsan to Hoegi Station) and the Jungang line (from Hoegi to Deokso) under the interim name Yongsan–Deokso Line.

An extension to Paldang Station on December 27, 2007, brought the official renaming of the service to Jungang line, although the line actually incorporates parts of both Gyeongwon and Jungang lines. In December 2008, the service was extended to Guksu Station, and an express train service was launched, operating twice a day during morning commuting hours. The express trains ran westward only, from Yangpyeong to Yongsan. The service was finally extended to Yongmun station in Yangpyeong County on December 23, 2009.

The western terminus was Yongsan station ever since the opening of the line. However, with the completion of Gyeongui Line extension to Yongsan on December 27, 2014, both the Jungang and Gyeongui lines were combined into the "Gyeongui-Jungang Line," and trains now run to Munsan station near the North Korean border.

Stations
This list does not include stations served only by Gyeongui-Jungang Line services.

After Jipyeong, major stations on the line include:

Samsan station
Seowonju station
Wonju station
Bongyang station, the terminus of the Chungbuk Line
Jecheon station, the terminus of the Taebaek Line. All Chungbuk Line trains departs from here due to the location of Bongyang Station
Danyang station
Yeongju station, the terminus of the Yeongdong and Gyeongbuk lines
Munsu station
Andong station, where most passenger trains from Seoul terminate
Uiseong station
Yeongcheon station, the terminus of the Daegu Line
Gyeongju station on the Donghae Line (from Gyeongju, some trains continue south on the Donghae Line to Bujeon station in Busan).

See also
 Gyeongui–Jungang Line
 Seoul Metropolitan Subway
 Korail
 Transportation in South Korea

References

External links

 
Seoul Metropolitan Subway lines
Railway lines in South Korea
Railway lines opened in 1942
1942 establishments in the Japanese colonial empire